Dictyaster is a small genus of starfish in the family Echinasteridae in the order Spinulosida.

Species
The following two species are recognised by the World Register of Marine Species:

Dictyaster xenophilus Wood-Mason & Alcock, 1891  
Dictyaster wood-masoni Alcock, 1893 (nomen nudum, Undescribed)

References

Echinasteridae